was a Japanese stage, film, and television actor.

Career
Nagata is best known for playing gruff, domineering fathers in films like Kinoshita's The Snow Flurry and Immortal Love. In the 1950s he led a campaign to establish a monument in honor of nine members of the Sakura Corps acting company who died while performing in Hiroshima at the time of the bombing, when Nagata and other troupe members had been away for military service or other reasons. The monument was dedicated in 1959.

Partial filmography
The Battle of Hong Kong (1942)
A Shadow Standing On Mt. Fuji (1942)
Stray Dog (1949)
The Human Condition (1959)
The Snow Flurry (1959)
Lucky Dragon No. 5 (1959)
Immortal Love (1961)
Sword of the Beast (1965)
The Long Darkness (1972)

References

External links

1907 births
1972 deaths
People from Nagasaki
Japanese male film actors
20th-century Japanese male actors